HD 23127 is a star in the southern constellation of Reticulum. With an apparent visual magnitude of +8.58 it is not visible to the naked eye, but can be viewed with a good pair of binoculars. The star is located at a distance of 307 light years from the Sun based on parallax, and is drifting further away with a radial velocity of ~22 km/s. It has an absolute magnitude of 3.62.

This is a G-type main-sequence star with a stellar classification of G2V, which means it is generating energy through core hydrogen fusion. HD 23127 is more massive than the Sun at 1.21 solar masses and has a 49% larger radius. It is metal-rich, having nearly double the abundance of iron in its atmosphere compared to the Sun. This star has an age of 4.5 billion years; about the same as the Sun.

On Friday, February 9, 2007, a  period jovian planet was found by using the wobble method by O'Toole and colleagues in Australia. It has minimum mass 53% greater than Jupiter and orbits with a 41% eccentricity. The maximum stable period for a hypothetical inner planet is 322.1 days.

See also
 List of extrasolar planets

References

External links
 

G-type main-sequence stars
Planetary systems with one confirmed planet
Reticulum (constellation)
Durchmusterung objects
023127
017054